Eduardo Ibarrola Nicolin (born 17 November 1951), is a Mexican-born diplomat. Former Mexican ambassador to the Netherlands and the Permanent Representative to the Organisation for the Prohibition of Chemical Weapons.

Past positions 
From May 2007 to 2012, Eduardo was the Mexican ambassador to Guatemala.

References

1951 births
Living people
Ambassadors of Mexico to Guatemala
Ambassadors of Mexico to the Netherlands